Kalyan Lok Sabha constituency is one of the 48 Lok Sabha (lower house of the Indian Parliament) constituencies in Maharashtra state in western India. This constituency was created on 19 February 2008 as a part of the implementation of the Presidential notification based on the recommendations of the Delimitation Commission of India constituted on 12 July 2002. It first held elections in 2009 and its first member of parliament (MP) was Anand Paranjpe of Shiv Sena. As of the 2014 elections, this constituency is represented by Shrikant Shinde also of Shiv Sena.

Assembly segments
At present, after the implementation of the Presidential notification on delimitation on 19 February 2008, kalyan Lok Sabha constituency comprises six Vidhan Sabha (legislative assembly) segments. These segments are:

Members of Parliament

Election results

General election 2019

General election 2014

General election 2009

See also
 Kalyan
 Thane district
 Thane Lok Sabha constituency
 List of Constituencies of the Lok Sabha

References

External links
Kalyan lok sabha  constituency election 2019 results details

Lok Sabha constituencies in Maharashtra
Lok Sabha constituencies in Maharashtra created in 2008
Kalyan-Dombivli
Politics of Thane district